Cedar Bluff is a neighborhood in Knoxville, Tennessee, United States. It located along Cedar Bluff Road north of I-40 in West Knoxville. The neighborhood lies at the heart of one of Knoxville's major commercial corridors, and is the site of a regional headquarters for Discovery, Inc.

Geography
Cedar Bluff is located west of the West Hills neighborhood, and east of Pellissippi Parkway (I-140). It is accessible by Cedar Bluff Road, Park West Boulevard, and Tennessee State Route 169 (Middlebrook Pike).

Economy
Cedar Bluff is the location of many of West Knoxville's office and technology parks, due its proximity to Oak Ridge and Oak Ridge National Laboratory.

Education

Public schools
Students in Cedar Bluff attend the following schools in the Knox County Schools district:
Cedar Bluff Elementary School located in Cedar Bluff
Cedar Bluff Middle School in Cedar Bluff
Hardin Valley High School in Hardin Valley

References

Neighborhoods in Knoxville, Tennessee